Silveh (also Romanized as Sīlveh) is a village in Lahijan-e Gharbi Rural District, Lajan District, Piranshahr County, West Azerbaijan Province, Iran. At the 2006 census, its population was 919, in 168 families. The village can be flooded when the Silveh Dam reaches full capacity.

References 

Populated places in Piranshahr County